Yua is a small genus of vines in the family Vitaceae, native to Nepal, S. China, Taiwan and Vietnam.

Species
The genus Yua includes:
Yua austro-orientalis 
Yua thomsonii  (synonym Yua chinensis )

References

Vitaceae
Vitaceae genera